Zamboanga City contains 28 islands off the mainland coast. The largest is Sacol (about 12 km long and 8 km wide). Three of them, (Vitali, Malanipa, and Sacol) are inhabited mostly by fishing residents and have their own barangays. The others are not regularly inhabited, but frequented by fishermen and scuba divers. A group of 11 islands located on the Moro Gulf coast are known collectively as the Eleven Islands,   Cabugan Island (approx. 11 hectares) is the largest of them.

The most popular islands among both tourists and local residents are the Great and Little Santa Cruz Islands, known for pink coral sands, and rich in coral, shell varieties.
, and sea life.

The islands are:
Bacungan Island
Baong Island
Bobo Island
Buguias Island
Cabog Island
Camugan Island
Gatusan Island
Great Santa Cruz Island
Kablingan Island
Lambang Island
Lamunigan Island
Lapinigan Island
Little Malanipa Island
Little Santa Cruz Island
Malanipa Island
Panganaban Island
Pangapuyan Island
Pitas Island
Sacol Island
Salangan Island
Sinunug Island
Taguiti Island
Tictabon Island
Tigburacao Island
Tumalutap Island
Vilan Vilan Island
Visa Island
Vitali Island

References

Zamboanga City

Zamboanga City-related lists